The Philippines women's national handball team is the national team of the Philippines. It takes part in international handball competitions and is governed by the Philippine Handball Federation. The team is also known by its moniker, Amigas.

History
The national team made its international debut at the 2013 Southeast Asian Women's Handball Championships in Ubon Ratchathani, Thailand, which was held in December 2013. The team, coached by former national basketball and fencing champion Joanna Franquelli was formed just two months before the tournament.

References

Women's national handball teams
handball women
National team